Season one of the 2016 edition of El Gran Show premiered on April 30, 2017.

In this season returned the 11 golden palette and the lifeguard. In addition, the VIP Jury returned, this time not co-opted by the public, but by a celebrity, which gave couples extra points. This season was also the first to introduce a new segment called "Partner Switch-Up", where each of the celebrities had to leave their original partner and dance with a new professional dancer for a week (a segment similar to Dancing with the Stars used since season 18). In this segment, the show presented "same-sex dance" for the first time.

On July 23, 2016, model & reality TV star Milett Figueroa and Patricio Quiñones were declared the winners, actress & singer Fiorella Cayo and Jimy Garcia finished second, while singer & actor Christian Domínguez and Isabel Acevedo finished third. It was confirmed that from this season, the winning couple would no longer be chosen by the public votes, but by the main judges and ten invited judges.

Cast

Couples 
On April 28, 2016, Melissa Klug was the first celebrity confirmed through a television spot. The rest of celebrities were announced during a special episode, on April 30. In the first week, professional dancers were introduced, including Isabel Acevedo, Diego Alza, José Morello and Patricio Quiñones.

Host and judges 
Gisela Valcárcel, Aldo Díaz and Jaime "Choca" Mandros returned as hosts, while Morella Petrozzi, Carlos Cacho and Pachi Valle Riestra returned as judges. Michelle Alexander, producer of América Televisión, became the new judge of the show. In addition, the VIP Jury returned, being conformed by a celebrity since this season.

Scoring charts 

Red numbers indicate the sentenced for each week
Green numbers indicate the best steps for each week
 the couple was eliminated that week
 the couple was safe in the duel
  the couple was eliminated that week and safe with a lifeguard
 the winning couple
 the runner-up couple
 the third-place couple

Average score chart 
This table only counts dances scored on a 40-point scale.

Highest and lowest scoring performances 
The best and worst performances in each dance according to the judges' 40-point scale are as follows:

Couples' highest and lowest scoring dances 
Scores are based upon a potential 40-point maximum.

Weekly scores 
Individual judges' scores in the charts below (given in parentheses) are listed in this order from left to right: Morella Petrozzi, Carlos Cacho, Michelle Alexander, Pachi Valle Riestra, VIP Jury.

Week 1: First Dances 
The couples danced cumbia, jazz, merengue, reggaeton or salsa. This week, none couples were sentenced.
Running order

Week 2: Face-off Night 
The couples were paired in six sets, in each set the couples perform one unlearned dance, only one of the couples in each set would gain one extra point awarded by the VIP judge.

Due to work issues, Kike Suero was unable to perform, so Cielo Lobos danced with Carlos Álvarez instead (former contestant on season 1 of the 2015).
Running order

Week 3: Party Night 
The couples performed one unlearned dance.
Running order

*The duel
Brunella & Diego: Safe
Melissa & Jorge: Safe
David & Ximena: Eliminated

Week 4: Characterization Night 
The couples (except those sentenced) performed one unlearned dance being characterized to popular music icons.

Due to work issues, Christian Dominguez was unable to perform, so Isabel Acevedo danced with Andrés "Andy V" Olano instead (former contestant on season 1 of 2012).
Running order

*The duel
Ivana & Franco: Eliminated
Melissa & Renzo: Safe

Week 5: Versus Night 
The couples were paired off into five sets, with each set of couples performing the same dance to different songs, only one of the couples in each set would gain an extra point awarded by the VIP judge.
Running order

*The duel
Brunella & Diego: Eliminated
Melissa & Ítalo: Safe

Week 6: Double Dance Under the Rain 
The couples (except those sentenced) performed a double dance (strip dance/merengue house) under the rain.

Michelle Alexander could not be present on this week's live show, so Santi Lesmes (guest judge in week 4) replaced her. For this reason there was no VIP judge present.
Running order

*The duel
Milett & Patricio: Safe
Juan & Manuela: Eliminated (but safe with the lifeguard)
Melissa & Ítalo: Safe

Week 7: Switch-Up Night 
The celebrities (except sentenced) performed one unlearned dance with a different partner selected by the production. Because last week the show could not be broadcast for the Copa América Centenario, the production decided that three couples were sentenced to eliminate two of them at the next week.
Running order

*The duel
Karla & Lucas: Eliminated
Kike & Cielo: Safe

Week 8: Trio Cha-cha-cha Night 
The couples (except those sentenced) danced trio cha-cha-cha involving another celebrity.
Running order

*The duel
Dorita & José: Eliminated
Kike & Cielo: Eliminated
Melissa & Ítalo: Safe

Week 9: Quarterfinals 
The couples (except sentenced couples) performed a double dance. In the little train, only the celebrities faced dancing strip dance.
Running order

*The duel
Juan & Manuela: Eliminated
Melissa & Ítalo: Safe

Week 10: Semifinals 
The couples danced jazz and a dance improvisation which involved seven different dance styles, all being rehearsed during the week by the couples and only one being chosen by a draw in the live show.

Due to work issues, Luigi Carbajal could not be present on the live show, so their dance in the first round was recorded a day before the show so that the judges could scored it. In the dance improvisation round, Thati Lira danced with Thiago Cunha instead.
Running order

*The duel
Melissa & Ítalo: Safe
Luigi & Thati: Eliminated (but safe with the lifeguard)

Week 11: Final 
On the first part, the couples danced freestyle.

On the second part, the remaining couples danced trio salsa involving another celebrity.

On the third part, the final three couples performed one unlearned ballroom dance.
Running order (Part 1)

Running order (Part 2)

Running order (Part 3)

Dance chart
The celebrities and professional partners will dance one of these routines for each corresponding week:
 Week 1: Cumbia, jazz, merengue, reggaeton or salsa (First Dances)
 Week 2: One unlearned dance (Face-off Night)
 Week 3: One unlearned dance (Party Night)
 Week 4: One unlearned dance (Characterization Night)
 Week 5: One unlearned dance or learned (Versus Night)
 Week 6: Double dance under the rain (Double Dance Under the Rain)
 Week 7: One unlearned dance (Switch-Up Night)
 Week 8: Trio Cha-cha-cha (Trio Cha-cha-cha Night)
 Week 9: Double dance & the little train (Quarterfinals)
 Week 10: Jazz & dance improvisation (Semifinals)
 Week 11: Freestyle, trio salsa & ballroom dances (Final)

 Highest scoring dance
 Lowest scoring dance
 Gained bonus points for winning
 Gained no bonus points for losing
 Danced, but not scored
In Italic indicate the dances performed in the duel

Guest judges 
Since the beginning of this season, a guest judge was present at each week to comment on and rate the dance routines. In the last week were present ten guest judges, who together with the main judges determined the winning couple.

Notes

References

External links 

El Gran Show
2016 Peruvian television seasons
Reality television articles with incorrect naming style